The Kavachi engine, commonly known as the TCI-Tech, was developed by SAIC Motor, based on a re-engineering of the Rover K-series engine. It is used in Roewe and MG Motor vehicles.

It is Drive-by-wire.

UK engineering firm Ricardo plc were tasked with remedying the well known faults of the K series by SAIC Motor for its introduction into the Chinese marketplace. With a redesigned head, improved waterways, stiffened block as well as changing the manufacturing process and quality of material, the Kavachi is seen as the pinnacle of K-series development. As of 2015, with more than half a decade in the market, there have been no reported issues of head gasket failure on cars using the Kavachi engine.

A point to note, the Kavachi engine is sometimes referred to and often confused with the N Series engine. The N Series is also a development of the original K Series but was in fact produced by Nanjing Automobile (NAC) a rival company at the time to SAIC. (later merged)

N Series was fitted into the relaunched MG TF in the UK and in the MG3 SW and MG7 in China.

Applications
 
 2008–2014 Roewe 550/MG 550
 2008–2016 Roewe 750/MG 750
 2009–2017 MG 6
 2011–2015 Roewe W5

References

Roewe 550 Specs

Roewe
Straight-four engines
Automobile engines